Tall Tall Trees is the musical pseudonym of vocalist and multi-instrumentalist banjo player Mike Savino. Though occasionally joined by collaborators, Savino usually performs as a "one-man psychedelic indie-folk orchestra" when playing as Tall Tall Trees. He is acknowledged as a pioneer in the world of experimental banjo music. The name of the project was inspired by the George Jones-Roger Miller song of the same name.

Savino calls his home-brewed, custom-built instrument/equipment set-up the "Banjotron 5000." He built it himself in order to be able to solo at live-shows. He runs his banjo "through a slab of effects pedals and loopers, bowing, drumming, and strumming out multi-textured arrangements to support his lyrically driven songs."

Stylistically, Tall Tall Trees as a, "a vital collision between Elliott Smith and Rogue Wave"  or compared to, "a new age Cat Stevens with dreamy harmonies." Influenced by Deer Tick and Fleet Foxes, Tall Tall Trees is most easily classified as "indie-folk" but the scope of Savino's formal experimentation and the complexity of the soundscapes created trouble the boundaries of this easy genre-definition.

Background 
Born in Long Island, Savino played bass guitar and sax in his younger days. He studied the jazz double bass at The New School. Touring in South America, and a more general exposure to world music during this period catalyzed Savino's love of folk music. After experimenting with a banjo he'd picked up while touring, he "took to it and started working on songs that would become the 2009 eponymous debut of Tall Tall Trees, released on Savino's own Good Neighbor Records." This debut was followed by his more introspective sophomore album Moment.

Savino toured extensively to promote Moment, performing solo at most of the gigs. During this phase, Savino also became a regular in Kishi Bashi's touring band, playing his custom banjo and singing backup on multiple tours. Tall Tall Trees' 2014 EP, The Seasonal, showcasing the expanded use of the banjo he'd evolved and empowered, inflecting his sound with a new and more distinctly psychedelic ambience.

In 2015, Savino worked as the caretaker of a vacant health resort surrounded by forest in Georgia for several months. Taking advantage of the solitude, he went to work on Tall Tall Trees third full-length album, Freedays.  Although the album was conceived as a solo-effort, Savino enlisted the help of Kishi bashi  and drummers Philip Mayer and Claude Coleman, Jr.(Ween) for finishing touches.  Tall Tall Trees signed with Joyful Noise Recordings in the autumn of 2016, releasing Freedays in early 2017.

On his 2020 LP, Wave of Golden Things, Savino abandoned the heavily-layered textures of 2017’s Freedays for a more organic, stripped-down approach, leaving his distinct voice as the centerpiece and opting for an immersive experience—setting up residence and a mobile recording rig on a hemp farm in the Appalachian mountains.

Discography

Albums
 A Wave of Golden Things (2020)
 Freedays (2017)
 Moment (2012)
 Tall Tall Trees (2009)

EPs
 The Seasonal (2014)

References

Living people
American folk musical groups
Joyful Noise Recordings albums
Joyful Noise Recordings artists
American indie folk groups
Year of birth missing (living people)